Imran Pratapgarhi is the current Member of Parliament Rajya Sabha from Maharashtra July 2022 and Indian Urdu-language poet and Indian National Congress politician from Uttar Pradesh, India. Pratapgarhi is known for his protest poetry that particularises the Muslim experience and identity in India and other parts of the world; he is especially known for his Urdu nazms "Madrasa" and "Han Main Kashmir Hoon."

Pratapgarhi was a losing candidate in the 2019 Indian general election as an Indian National Congress candidate from Moradabad Lok Sabha constituency. Pratapgarhi was appointed chairman of the Minority Department of the All India Congress Committee on June 3, 2021.

Early life and poetic career
Pratapgarhi was born as Mohammed Imran Khan to Mohammed Iliyas Khan on 6 August 1987 in Pratapgarh, Uttar Pradesh. He completed his masters in Hindi literature from Allahabad University. At that time he wrote poetry in Hindi and participated in Kavi Sammelans (poetry symposiums). He started participating in Mushairas in 2008 and his Nazm Madrasa became popular. Apart from Madarsa, his other writings include Filisteen, Najeeb, and Umar out of over 100 Nazms written by him.

Political career 
A critic of Prime Minister of India Narendra Modi, Pratapgarhi joined the Indian National Congress and contested in 2019 Indian general election from Moradabad, where he lost to S. T. Hasan of Samajwadi Party with a margin of more than half a million votes (590,218 votes).

Pratapgarhi was appointed AICC minority department chairman on 3 June 2021.

In June 2022, Pratapgarhi was elected to the Rajya Sabha from Maharashtra on Indian National Congress nomination.

Positions held

Awards
Yash Bharti Award 2016 - highest Award of Uttar Pradesh Government.

See also

 List of poets from Pratapgarh

References

1987 births
Living people
Indian male poets
Urdu-language poets
Hindi-language poets
Indian lyricists
Poets from Uttar Pradesh
Indian National Congress politicians from Uttar Pradesh
People from Pratapgarh, Uttar Pradesh